Chlorella pituita is a species of euryhaline, unicellular microalga in the Division Chlorophyta. It is spherical to oval-shaped and is solitary

References

Further reading

Jeffryes, Clayton, et al. "Energy conversion in an internally illuminated annular‐plate airlift photobioreactor." Engineering in Life Sciences (2015).
Bashan, Yoav, et al. "Chlorella sorokiniana (formerly C. vulgaris) UTEX 2714, a non-thermotolerant microalga useful for biotechnological applications and as a reference strain." Journal of Applied Phycology (2015): 1–9.

External links

pituita